Chitta Katha Lake is an alpine lake located in Shounter Valley, Azad Kashmir, Pakistan. This lake is sacred for Hindus, as they consider this lake an abode of Shiva.

Access
The lake is accessible from Kel by a 20 kilometers (12 mi) jeep track and then 5 kilometers (3.1 mi) hiking trek. Kel is the base camp to this lake.

Religious significance
This lake is sacred for Hindus, as they consider this lake an abode of Shiva.

See also 
 Ratti Gali Lake
 Saral Lake

References 

Lakes of Azad Kashmir
Places to Visit in Neelum Valley